This is a list of rivers in the Gambia. This list is arranged  by drainage basin, with respective tributaries indented under each larger stream's name.

Atlantic Ocean

Massarinko Bolon
Niji Bolon
Gambia River
Buniadu Bolon
Lamin Bolon
Mandina Bolon
Pirang Bolon
Bulok Bolon
Sami Bolon
Bintang Bolon
Jurunku Bolon
Koular Bolon (Mini Minium Bolon)
Boa Bolon
Sofaniama Bolon
Simbara Bolon
Nianija Bolon
Pallan Bolon
Pachar Bolon
Sandougou River
Punti Bolon
Mansala Bolon
Sankutu Bolon
Tuba Kuta Bolon
Prufu Bolon
Kumbija Bolon
Shima Simong Bolon
Sine Bolon
Oyster Creek
Cape Creek
Kotu Stream
River Tanji
Tujering River
River Benifet
Allahein River

References
U.S. National Imagery and Mapping Agency, ND28-9 Banjul, 2001 
U.S. National Imagery and Mapping Agency, ND28-10 Nioro du Rip, 1966
U.S. National Imagery and Mapping Agency, ND28-11 Tambacounda, 1966
 GEOnet Names Server

Gambia
Rivers